Brosius is a surname. Notable people with the surname include:

Charlton Brosius, American tug-of-war competitor
Eric Brosius, American musician and video game developer
Fernand Brosius (1934–2014), Luxembourgian footballer
George Brosius, American gymnast
Jürgen Brosius, (*1948) German evolutionary biologist
Laura Brosius, German football player
Marriott Henry Brosius, member of the U.S. Congress from Pennsylvania
Scott Brosius, American baseball player
Terri Brosius, American musician and video game developer